The 2020–21 season is Accrington Stanley's 52nd season in their history and the third consecutive season in EFL League One, Along with League One, the club also participated in the FA Cup, EFL Cup and EFL Trophy.

The season covers the period from 1 July 2020 to 30 June 2021.

Transfers

Transfers in

Loans in

Loans out

Transfers out

Notes

First-team squad

Pre-season

Competitions

EFL League One

League table

Results summary

Results by matchday

Matches

The 2020–21 season fixtures were released on 21 August.

September

October

November

December

January

February

March

April

May

FA Cup

The draw for the first round was made on Monday 26, October.

EFL Cup

The first round draw was made on 18 August, live on Sky Sports, by Paul Merson.

EFL Trophy

The regional group stage draw was confirmed on 18 August. The second round draw was made by Matt Murray on 20 November, at St Andrew’s. The third round was made on 10 December 2020 by Jon Parkin.

Statistics

|}

Goals record

Disciplinary record

References

Accrington Stanley
Accrington Stanley F.C. seasons